Itum-Kale (Iton-Qälla), also spelled as Itum-Kali is a rural locality (a selo) and the administrative center of Itum-Kalinsky District, the Chechen Republic, Russia. Population:  In 1944 the area's Chechen inhabitant were deported on the order of Joseph Stalin and the area transferred to Georgia; this decision was reversed in the late 1950s and the Chechens who had survived were allowed to return.

People from Itum-Kale 
 Pasikhat Dzhukalaeva - supercentenarian was born nearby.

References

Notes

Sources

Rural localities in Itum-Kalinsky District